is a Japanese former football player.

Playing career
Yamaji was born in Higashimatsushima on January 13, 1971. After graduating from Kokushikan University, he joined Japan Football League (JFL) club Toshiba in 1993. He played several matches from first season and became a regular player as center back in 1995. In 1996, he moved to JFL club Brummell Sendai (later Vegalta Sendai) based in his local. He played as regular player from first season and the club was promoted to J2 League from 1999. His opportunity to play decreased in 2000 and he retired end of 2000 season.

Club statistics

References

External links

1971 births
Living people
Kokushikan University alumni
Association football people from Miyagi Prefecture
Japanese footballers
J2 League players
Japan Football League (1992–1998) players
Hokkaido Consadole Sapporo players
Vegalta Sendai players
Association football defenders